Messingham is a village and civil parish in North Lincolnshire, England.

West Lindsey is 1 mile to the south, as is Scotter.

Messingham has a population of over 4,000 people, falling to 3,718 at the 2011 census.

Community 
The village has a history of sheep farming.

Schools serving the village are Messingham Primary School, Frederick Gough School, Queen Elizabeth's High School, Huntcliff and John Leggott College. The parish church is dedicated to the Holy Trinity. There is also a Methodist church, on 24 July 1772. John Wesley was known to preach in Messingham, possibly at the site of the Green Tree public house. Village public houses are the Horn Inn, Green Tree Inn and Crown Inn on High Street, and the Bird in the Barley on Northfield Road (A159).

Scunthorpe's 'British Steel' steel works is a major employer of local people.

On the outskirts of Messingham is Grange Park Golf Club, Messingham Zoo and nearby on the B1400 road, a nature reserve. The Sand Quarry is a Site of Special Scientific Interest.

Sport  

Messingham has various sports clubs. Football, Cricket and Bowls clubs are based at the Northfield Road site.

References

External links

 Messingham Primary school
 Methodist church
 Messingham Sand Quarry
 Messingham Bird Watching
 messingham.net, Local online magazine

Villages in the Borough of North Lincolnshire
Civil parishes in Lincolnshire